Stratford Hall may refer to:
Stratford Hall (school), a private school in Vancouver, British Columbia, Canada
Stratford Hall (plantation), a plantation in Westmoreland County, Virginia, United States, birthplace of Robert E. Lee and home to four generations of the Lee family

Architectural disambiguation pages